The Pratītyasamutpāda-gāthā, also referred to as the Pratītyasamutpāda-dhāraṇī (dependent origination incantation) or ye dharmā hetu, is a verse (gāthā) and a dhāraṇī widely used by Buddhists in ancient times which was held to have the function of a mantra or sacred spell. It was often found carved on chaityas, stupas, images, or placed within chaityas. 

The Pratītyasamutpāda-gāthā is used in Sanskrit as well as Pali. It is found in Mahavagga section of Vinaya Pitaka of the Pali Canon. The mantra has been widely used. It has been used at Sarnath, Tirhut, Kanari Copperplate, Tagoung, Sherghatti, near Gaya, Allahabad column, Sanchi etc.

According to Buddhist scriptural sources, these words were used by the Arahat Assaji (Skt: Aśvajit) when asked about the teaching of the Buddha. On the spot, Sariputta (Skt: Śāriputra) attained the stage of stream entry and later shared the verses with his friend Moggallāna (Skt: Maudgalyayana) who also attained stream entry. They then went to the Buddha, along with 500 of their disciples, and asked to become his disciples.

Original text

Sanskrit 

The gāthā / dhāraṇī in Sanskrit is as follows: ये धर्मा हेतु-प्रभवा हेतुं तेषां तथागतो ह्यवदत् 
तेषां च यो निरोध एवंवादी महाश्रमणःIAST transliteration:  ye dharmā hetuprabhavā hetuṃ teṣāṃ tathāgato hyavadat, teṣāṃ ca yo nirodha evaṃvādī mahāśramaṇaḥ

Pali 
In Pali, the text reads:“𑀬𑁂 𑀥𑀫𑁆𑀫𑀸 𑀳𑁂𑀢𑀼𑀧𑁆𑀧𑀪𑀯𑀸, 𑀢𑁂𑀲𑀁 𑀳𑁂𑀢𑀼𑀁 𑀢𑀣𑀸𑀕𑀢𑁄 𑀆𑀳𑁇 
𑀢𑁂𑀲𑀜𑁆𑀘 𑀬𑁄 𑀦𑀺𑀭𑁄𑀥𑁄, 𑀏𑀯𑀁𑀯𑀸𑀤𑀻 𑀫𑀳𑀸𑀲𑀫𑀡𑁄”𑀢𑀺𑁈Transliteration into Latin script:ye dhammā hetuppabhavā tesaṁ hetuṁ tathāgato āha,tesaṃ ca yo nirodho evaṁvādī mahāsamaṇo.

English
Daniel Boucher translates as follows:Those dharmas which arise from a cause, the Tathāgata has declared their cause,

and that which is the cessation of them. Thus the great renunciant (sramana) has taught.The Pāḷi commentaries take the first line as pointing to suffering (dukkha), the second to its cause (samudaya) and the third to its cessation (nirodha).

Tibetan 
In Tibetan:ཆོས་གང་རྒྱུ་བྱུང་དེ་དག་གི། །རྒྱུ་དང་དེ་འགོག་གང་ཡིན་པའང་། །དེ་བཞིན་གཤེགས་པས་བཀའ་སྩལ་ཏེ། །དགེ་སློང་ཆེན་པོས་དེ་སྐད་གསུངས།།
or
ཆོས་རྣམས་ཐམས་ཅད་རྒྱུ་ལས་བྱུང་། །དེ་རྒྱུ་དེ་བཞིན་གཤེགས་པས་གསུངས། །རྒྱུ་ལ་འགོག་པ་གང་ཡིན་པ། །དགེ་སྦྱོང་ཆེན་པོས་འདི་སྐད་གསུངས།

The Wylie transliteration is:chos gang rgyu byung de dag gi/ rgyu dang de 'gog gang yin pa'ng
de bzhin gshegs pas bka' stsal te/ dge slong chen po de skad gsungs //
chos rnams thams cad rgyu las byung/ de rgyu de bzhin gshegs pas gsungs/ 
rgyu la 'gog pa gang yin pa/ dge sbyong chen pos 'di skad gsungs //

Usage

Copper plate in the Schøyen Collection 
A copper place from the Gandhara region (probably Bamiyan), dated to about 5th century AD has a variation of the mantra. It appears to have some mistakes, for example it uses taṭhāgata instead of tathāgata. It is now in the Schøyen Collection.

On Buddha images 
The mantra was often also carved below the images of the Buddha. A Buddhist screen (parikara) and accompanying Buddha image is now preserved at Museum of Fine Arts, Boston. While the objects were found in South India, the mantra is given in north Indian 8-9th century script, perhaps originating from the Pala region.

Malaysia inscriptions 
The Bukit Meriam inscription from Kedah includes two additional lines. The inscription is now in the Indian Museum, Calcutta. Other similar inscriptions were found in the Kedah region.

The additional lines can be translated as:Through ignorance karma is accumulated, the cause of birth is karma.

Through knowledge karma is not accumulated. Through absence of karma, one is not reborn.

Inscriptions in Pallava scripts found in Thailand 
Ye dharma hetu is also found in Thailand including the stupa peak found in 1927 from Nakhon Pathom  along with a wall of Phra Pathom Chedi and a shrine in Phra Pathom chedi found in 1963, a brick found in 1963 from Chorakhesamphan township, U Thong district of Suphanburi, stone inscriptions found in 1964  and the stone inscription found in 1980 from Srithep Archeological site. All of them have been inscribed in Pallava scripts of Pali language dated 12th Buddhist century (the 7th Century in common era). Furthermore, there are Sanskrit version of ye dharma hetu inscribed in Pallava scripts in clay amulets  found in 1989 from an archaeological site in Yarang district of Pattani dated to the 7th century CE.

See also
Āṭānāṭiya Sutta
 Awgatha, Burmese Buddhist Prayer
 Cetiya
 Dependent Origination
 Heart Sutra
 Jinapañjara
 Kāraṇḍavyūha Sūtra
 Maṅgala Sutta
 Mani stone
 Metta Sutta
 Nīlakaṇṭha Dhāraṇī
 Om mani padme hum
 Paritta
 Ratana Sutta
 Sacca-kiriyā, Declaration of Truth
 Shurangama Mantra

References

External links
Ye dharmā hetuprabhava - Causation
- Sāriputta and Moggallāna's story in the Mahavagga

Buddhist mantras
Sanskrit words and phrases